Dead Earth Politics was an American heavy metal rock band formed in Austin, Texas in 2005. The band's final line up consisted of Ven Scott, Tim Driscoll, Lennis Hayes and Aaron Canady. Well known for its blend of old and new school metal influences that some have coined as “Progressive Power Thrash” has been described as a cross between Iron Maiden and Lamb of God. The group rose to prominence in the mid late 2000s with their engaging live performances. With one full-length LP and three EPs, the latest release was on March 14, 2015, with their Men Become God’s EP.

History

Formation 
The band was originally formed in Austin, Texas in 2003 by Ernie Clark, Will Little, Mason Evans and Paul Rosales, under another name. In 2005, the quartet began auditioning vocalists, and narrowed it down to two individuals. Ven Scott was the second choice, but after their first choice went to jail, Evans called Brown back and offered him the position. After a few shows, they decided to change the band name to Dead Earth Politics, a name that Evans conceived. 
  The band began as quoted by Ven “as a bunch of idiots who thought we could eliminate stress in our lives through art”.

Debut and early years 
Mark the Resistance was the first EP release of Dead Earth Politics career, released in 2006. And five years later The Weight of Poseidon is Dead Earth Politics’ first full-length album released on iTunes on March 29, 2010. With 10.13 as a fan favorite and lyrics written by bassist, Will the album is known as  raging rock’n’roll with thick, surprisingly engaging riffs that thunder like the roiling sea on its cover. Add to this roaring mix vocals that are rough and gruff, mixed in with some clean vocals as well, and the result is an explosive sound with enough variety to hold your attention throughout.

Tim, fresh from Berklee university, joined the band in 2012 and met together on Craigslist. Aaron, originally guitar player from the band Shrapnel, joined in 2014 creating the “band that the people envisioned” according to Ven.

2012 – 2015 
After four years of near silence, Dead Earth Politics released the first of a three EP series, The Queen of Steel. The Queen of Steel is Dead Earth Politics’ second EP release of their career, with three songs featured on the album, those being “Redneck Dragon Slayer”, “The Queen of Steel”, and “Madness of the Wanderer”. The EP was released on iTunes on March 1, 2014.

Men Become Gods was released on iTunes on March 14, 2015. The EP includes four songs, “Casting Stones”, “Men Become Gods”, “Ice & Fire”, and “Crimson Dichotomy”. This EP is the second of the EP series, following up their “The Queen of Steel” EP.

Dead Earth Politics was a part of the SXSW lineup in Austin, TX in March 2014. The band was accompanied by the following bands: The Launderettes, Kay Leotard, Complete, Hellbenders, AEGES, and Fresno.

In May 2014, Dead Earth Politics was personally invited to play the first Rock the Heart tribute to Mike Scaccia in Austin, TX. Dead Earth Politics played alongside Warbeast and Down.

Band has been a part of Synsane Radio's Austin Autism Society Benefit twice.

In October 2013, Dead Earth Politics was also invited to perform at the Housecore Horror Film Festival in Austin, TX. The festival includes film showcases of various forms of horror films, as well as three nights of the “heaviest music on the planet”. Dead Earth Politics was invited back for the 2015 film festival.

The band also made its return to SXSW in 2015, soon after their release of the Men Become Gods EP. They performed in Austin's local Dirty Dog Bar with Excessum, Venomous Maximus, Unlocking the Truth, Royal Thunder, and Betrayal.

Their most recent milestone was being invited to play the 30th anniversary party for GWAR at their annual GWAR B-Q in Richmond, VA, August 16, 2015.

2017 

In 2017, remaining members Ven, Tim and Aaron laid the band to rest. This is confirmed in an interview with enFocus Magazine where Ven confirms, "It was clear to both Tim and I (and at the time, Aaron Canady as well) that Dead Earth Politics had run its course."  This is further confirmed on Scott's own website  as well as the Dead Earth Politics homepage where an image appears of the final line up and the text "2005 - 2017".

Musical style 
Well known for a blend of old and new school metal influences that some have coined as “Progressive Power Thrash” has been described as a cross between Iron Maiden and Lamb of God. Dead Earth Politics pull from a number of influences all over the spectrum including Iron Maiden, Judas Priest, Lamb of God, layer, Metallica, Megadeth, Dream Theater, Kiss to name a few. But Dead Earth Politics specialty comes in because they do not just limit themselves to heavy metal by pulling from other influences like Muse, Holdsworth, Bad Company and others to create their unique modern metal sound.

Members

Discography

Tours 
As noted above, Dead Earth Politics was invited to perform at 6th annual Gwar-B-Q festival. In addition to this and as means of celebrating Gwar's 30th anniversary, Dead Earth Politics, Gwar and Metal injection teamed up to create "The Road to Gwar-B-Q". This was a tour where Dead Earth Politics chronicled on video their exploits leading up to the Gwar-B-Q festival and celebrating Gwar's birthday. The dates and videos are below:
 August 5, 2015 - Houston, TX - Video
 August 7, 2015 - San Antonio, TX - Video
 August 8, 2015 - Austin, TX - Video
 August 9, 2015 - Lafayette, LA - Video
 August 12, 2015 - Montgomery, AL - Video
 August 13, 2015 - Albany, GA - Video
 August 15, 2015 - Richmond, VA - GWAR-B-Q

Awards 

 Austin Chronicle's Best Performing Metal Band 2012
 Austin Chronicle's Best Performing Metal Band 2013
 Austin Chronicle's Best Performing Metal Band 2014
 Ultimate Local Music Worldwide's Track of the Year -  “Redneck Dragonslayer”

New Projects 

Immediately after the dissolution of Dead Earth Politics, Ven Scott and Tim Driscoll formed Runescarred. As Driscoll mentions in an interview with enFocus Magazine, the music in Runescarred differs from Dead Earth Politics in that it is "like a prizefighter getting lean and dropping a weight class. It is a more melodic and expansive sound, no less heavy but not quite as claustrophobic."  According to his website, Ven continues management duties with Runescarred as well. 

According to Runescarred's website, their first E.P. will be due out in June 2018.

References

External links
 
 Dead Earth Politics Band Camp Page
 Dead Earth Politics on ReverbNation
 "Men Become Gods" Exclusive Release on New Noise Magazine
 Runescarred Official Website
Heavy metal musical groups from Texas
Musical groups from Austin, Texas